Tajine Mtewem, usually abbreviated to Mtewem (Arabic: طاجين مثوم) is a traditional Algerian dish, and more specifically Algerine (from the city of Algiers), the dish is made from minced meatballs, pieces of chicken or lamb meat, garlic, chickpeas and almonds. Its sauce is prepared with a grated onion and a lot of garlic, as its name suggests the word mtewem  means “with garlic", and is usually cooked in a Tajine pot. like most Algerian dishes, it can be prepared with either a white sauce, or a red spicy sauce.

Gallery

References 

Algerian cuisine
Maghrebi cuisine
African cuisine
Meat dishes
North African cuisine